This is a list of all cricketers who have played first-class, List A or Twenty20 cricket for the Barbados national cricket team in the West Indies. Seasons given are first and last seasons; the player did not necessarily play in all the intervening seasons.

A

 Grantley Adams, 1925/26
 David Allan, 1955/56–1965/66
 Anthony Alleyne, 2016/17–2018/19
 Hartley Alleyne, 1978/79–1993
 Marven Alleyne, 1974/75
 Peter Alleyne, 1987/88–1988/89
 Robert Alleyne, 1871/72
 William Alleyne, 1887/88–1894/95
 Frederick Archer, 1907/08–1925/26
 Nichollas Archer, 1912/13
 Greg Armstrong, 1973/74–1977/78
 Sean Armstrong, 1995/96–2001/02
 Robert Arthur, 1896/97
 Winslow Ashby, 1970/71–1974/75
 Anthony Atkins, 1958-1958/59
 Denis Atkinson, 1946/47–1960/61
 Eric Atkinson, 1949/50–1957/58
 Francis Austin, 1910/11–1912/13
 Henry Adrian Austin, 1996/97
 Henry Fitzherbert Austin, 1897/98–1903/04
 Harold Austin, 1894/95–1925/26
 John Austin, 1905/06
 Ryan Austin, 2000/01–2006/07

B

 Larry Babb, 2010–2011/12
 Herbert Bailey, 1908/09–1910/11
 Keith Bancroft, 1904/05
 Kenneth Bancroft, 1904/05
 Hughley Barker, 1951/52–1955/56
 Howell Barnes, 1903/04–1904/05
 Luther Barrow, 1904/05–1905/06
 Barto Bartlett, 1923/24–1938/39
 Richard Batson, 1909/10–1911/12
 Clyde Beckles, 1977/78–1978/79
 Joe Benn, 1901/02
 Sulieman Benn, 1999/2000–2018/19
 Jason Bennett, 2004–2006/07
 Carlisle Best, 1979/80–1993/94
 Tino Best, 2001/02–2015/16
 Arthur Bethell, 1963/64–1969/70
 Lionel Birkett, 1923/24–1928/29
 Theodore Birkett, 1942–1956/57
 Derrick Bishop, 2005/06–2007/08
 Joshua Bishop, 2017/18–2019/20
 Roger Blackman, 1940/41–1941/42
 Wayne Blackman, 1999/2000–2007/08
 Charles Blades, 1904/05–1905/06
 Colin Blades, 1963/64–1969/70
 M Blagrove, 1997/98
 Leniko Boucher, 2018/19–2019/20
 Rashidi Boucher, 2008/09–2018/19
 Charles Bourne, 1931/32–1942
 Bill Bourne, 1970/71–1976/77
 William Bowring, 1899/1900–1901/02
 Darnley Boxill, 1964/65–1971/72
 Camarie Boyce, 2019/20
 Keith Boyce, 1964/65–1975/76
 Cecil Bradshaw, 1951/52
 Ian Bradshaw, 1994/95–2006/07
 Rudolph Bradshaw, 1964/65
 Rawle Brancker, 1955/56–1969/70
 Kenneth Branker, 1951/52–1955/56
 Adrian Brathwaite, 2000
 Carlos Brathwaite, 2010–2017/18
 Hubert Brathwaite, 1978/79–1983/84
 Justin Brathwaite, 2012/13–2013/14
 John Brathwaite, 1891/92
 Kemar Brathwaite, 2015/16
 Kraigg Brathwaite, 2008/09–2019/20
 Shamarh Brooks, 2005/06–2019/20
 Oliver Broome, 1964/65
 Henderson Broomes, 1994/95–1998/99
 Noel Broomes, 1982/83–1986/87
 Alfred Browne, 1883/84–1887/88
 Clement Browne, 1891/92–1904/05
 Allan Browne, 1907/08–1929/30
 Don Browne, 1919/20–1926/27
 Courtney Browne, 1990/91–2005/06
 Snuffy Browne, 1908/09–1910/11
 Patrick Browne, 2004/05–2011/12
 Robert Browne, 1883/84–1896/97
 Samuel Browne, 1864/65–1871/72
 Henderson Bryan, 1993–2001/02
 Irwin Burke, 1938/39
 Henry Burnett, 1871/72
 Chetwyn Burnham, 1964/65
 Roland Butcher, 1974/75
 John Byer, 1929/30–1935/36
 Robin Bynoe, 1957/58–1972/73

C

 Barry Callender, 1994/95
 Sherwin Campbell, 1989/90–2004/05
 Trevor Campbell, 1969/70
 George Carew, 1934/35–1947/48
 John Carrington, 1865/66
 Duncan Carter, 1964/65
 Jonathan Carter, 2007/08–2019/20
 Edward Challenor, 1894/95–1895/96
 George Challenor, 1904/05–1929/30
 Robert Challenor, 1904/05–1924/25
 Vicary Challenor, 1901/02–1903/04
 Nikolai Charles, 2005/06–2016/17
 Roston Chase, 2010/11–2018/19
 Frederick Clairmonte, 1909/10
 Bertie Clarke, 1937/38–1938/39
 Carleton Clarke, 1893/94
 Michael Clarke, 1940/41
 Mitchell Clarke, 1928/29
 Nolan Clarke, 1969/70–1976/77
 Shakeem Clarke, 2017/18
 Shirley Clarke, 2000–2005/06
 Sylvester Clarke, 1976/77–1981/82
 Thomas Clarke, 1871/72
 Theodore Clarke, 1883/84–1887/88
 William Clarke, 1864/65–1887/88
 Hallam Cole, 1894/95–1907/08
 Pedro Collins, 1996/97–2011/12
 Corey Collymore, 1998/99–2008/09
 Ernest Collymore, 1922/23
 Walter Collymore, 1883/84
 Valance Connell, 1969/70
 Learie Constantine, 1938/39
 Kyle Corbin, 2014/15–2016/17
 Allan Cox, 1895/96
 Gustavus Cox, 1893/94–1905/06
 Hampden Cox, 1887/88
 Percy Cox, 1896/97–1899/1900
 Cuthbert Crick, 1940/41
 Chester Cumberbatch, 1933/34–1938/39
 Dave Cumberbatch, 1983/84–1984/85
 Julian Cumberbatch, 1907/08
 Anderson Cummins, 1988/89–1995/96
 Miguel Cummins, 2011/12–2019/20
 Dane Currency, 2015/16

D

 Darnley Da Costa, 1899/1900
 Wayne Daniel, 1975/76–1984/85
 Clairmonte Depeiaza, 1951/52–1956/57
 Othneil Downes, 1958–1958/59
 Shane Dowrich, 2009/10–2019/20
 Hillard Doyle, 1961/62
 Dominic Drakes, 2017/18–2018/19
 Vasbert Drakes, 1991/92–2003/04

E

 Corey Edwards, 2009/10
 Fidel Edwards, 2001/02–2014/15
 John Edwards, 1931/32–1937/38
 Kirk Edwards, 2005/06–2014/15
 Prof Edwards, 1961/62–1976/77
 Dale Ellcock, 1986/87
 Ricardo Ellcock, 1983/84–1984/85
 Greenidge Elliott, 1883/84
 James Emtage, 1921/22
 Roddy Estwick, 1982/83–1993
 Edward Evelyn, 1883/84

F

 Stephen Farmer, 1969/70–1976/77
 Wilfred Farmer, 1946/47–1958
 Walter Fields, 1907/08–1912/13
 Campbell Foster, 1936/37–1937/38
 Geoffrey Foster, 1958–1961/62
 Leon Foster, 1931/32–1935/36
 Teddy Foster, 1975/76–1980/81
 Walter Foster, 1941/42
 George Francis, 1924/25–1929/30
 Michael Frederick, 1944/45

G

 Joel Garner, 1975/76–1993
 Will Gibbs, 1907/08–1926/27
 Ottis Gibson, 1990/91–1998/99
 Arnold Gilkes, 1983/84–1987/88
 Benjamin Gilkes, 1919/20–1929/30
 Odwin Gilkes, 1984/85
 Oswald Gilkes, 1919/20
 Shirley Gill, 1940/41
 Stanton Gittens, 1934/35–1944/45
 Corey Glasgow, 2000–2000/01
 John Goddard, 1936/37–1957/58
 Kenneth Goddard, 1948/49
 Clifford Goodman, 1887/88–1896/97
 Gerald Goodman, 1893/94
 Percy Goodman, 1891/92–1912/13
 Walter Goodman, 1891/92–1893/94
 Hattian Graham, 1997/98–2000
 Marlon Graham, 2010/11
 Ormond Graham, 1942/43
 Ronald Graham, 1978/79
 Shawn Graham, 2000–2004/05
 Adrian Grant, 1986/87–1989
 Herbert Greaves, 1923/24–1929/30
 Justin Greaves, 2012/13–2019/20
 Sherlon Greaves, 1983/84–1993/94
 Edmund Greene, 1943/44–1945/46
 Vibert Greene, 1985/86–1987/88
 Alvin Greenidge, 1974/75–1993
 Gordon Greenidge, 1972/73–1993
 Geoff Greenidge, 1966/67–1975/76
 Winston Greenidge, 1951/52
 Malcolm Greenidge, 1895/96
 Whitney Greenidge, 1958–1960/61
 Tyrone Greenidge, 1985/86–1987/88
 Adrian Griffith, 1992/93–2001/02
 Charlie Griffith, 1959/60–1966/67
 Teddy Griffith, 1953/54–1955/56
 Herman Griffith, 1921/22–1940/41
 Harold Griffith, 1943/44–1946/47
 Russell Griffiths, 1933/34

H

 Wes Hall, 1955/56–1970/71
 Gerry Harding, 1974/75
 Keon Harding, 2016/17–2019/20
 Arnott Harris, 1934/35
 Joseph Harris, 1988/89
 Leslie Harris, 1942–1944/45
 Albert Hassell, 1955/56
 Desmond Haynes, 1976/77–1994/95
 Henry Haynes, 1864/65
 Jason Haynes, 2005/06–2010/11
 Fitz Hinds, 1901/02–1904/05
 Hilton Hinds, 1907/08
 Jason Hinds, 2010
 Ryan Hinds, 1998/99–2014/15
 Ernest Hinkson, 1887/88
 Stephen Hinkson, 1969–1973/74
 Edwin Hoad, 1896/97
 Teddy Hoad, 1922/23–1937/38
 Edward Hoad, 1944/45–1953/54
 John Hoad, 1919/20–1921/22
 William Hoad, 1901/02
 Adzil Holder, 1951/52–1958/59
 Alcindo Holder, 2005/06–2012/13
 Chaim Holder, 2018/19
 Chemar Holder, 2017/18–2019/20
 Jason Holder, 2008/09–2019/20
 Roland Holder, 1985/86–2000/01
 Vanburn Holder, 1966/67–1977/78
 David Holford, 1960/61–1978/79
 Kyle Hope, 2009/10–2013/14
 Shai Hope, 2012/13–2017/18
 Leonard Horne, 1901/02
 Tony Howard, 1965/66–1974/75
 William Howell, 1883/84–1894/95
 Ricky Hoyte, 1988/89–1998/99
 Chris Humphrey, 2000
 Conrad Hunte, 1950/51–1966/67
 Terry Hunte, 1983/84–1987/88
 Ryan Hurley, 1995/96–2004/05
 Geoffrey Hutchinson, 1955/56
 Leo Hutchinson, 1925/26–1929/30
 Lionel Hutson, 1922/23–1924/25

I

 Harry Ince, 1912/13–1929/30
 Bruce Inniss, 1942
 Clifford Inniss, 1928/29–1938/39
 Michael Inniss, 1985/86–1989

J

 Edward Jackman, 1887/88–1897/98
 Allan Jemmott, 1891/92
 Allison Johnson, 1987/88–1988/89
 Anthony Johnson, 1987/88–1989/90
 Nigel Johnson, 1978/79–1986/87
 Wesley Johnson, 1896/97
 Aaron Jones, 2013/14–2018/19
 Elon Jones, 1986/87
 Robert Jones, 1911/12
 Chris Jordan, 2011/12–2012/13
 Emmerson Jordan, 1988/89–1989
 Harold Jordan, 1936/37
 Shane Julien, 1980/81

K

 John Kidney, 1904/05–1931/32
 Anthony King, 1960/61–1970/71
 Collis King, 1972/73–1993
 Earnest King, 1864/65–1865/66
 Erskine King, 1966/67–1968/69
 Frank King, 1947/48–1956/57
 Horace King, 1948/49–1952/53
 Nicholas Kirton, 2018/19–2019/20
 Tyrone Knight, 1977/78

L

 Arthur Laborde, 1895/96
 Peter Lashley, 1957/58–1974/75
 Mark Lavine, 1992/93–1998/99
 Oliver Layne, 1901/02–1904/05
 Ryan Layne, 2004/05–2010/11
 George Learmond, 1894/95–1895/96
 George Linton, 1981/82–1989/90
 Frank Lobo, 1933/34
 Callitos Lopez, 2000–2004
 John Lucas, 1945/46–1949/50
 Noel Lucas, 1953/54–1954/55

M

 Donald McAuley, 1887/88–1897/98
 Zachary McCaskie, 2019/20
 William McClean, 1864/65
 Preston McSween, 2016/17
 Geoffrey Mapp, 1984/85
 Dave Marshall, 1992/93–2000/01
 Malcolm Marshall, 1977/78–1990/91
 Norman Marshall, 1940/41–1955/56
 Roy Marshall, 1945/46–1952/53
 Manny Martindale, 1929/30–1935/36
 Dale Mason, 2000
 Kenneth Mason, 1903/04–1925/26
 Neville Mason, 1984/85
 Lawrence Maxwell, 1968/69–1978/79
 Anthony Mayers, 1954/55–1955/56
 Antonio Mayers, 1998/99–2006
 Kyle Mayers, 2011/12–2019/20
 Michael Mayers, 1905/06–1908/09
 Dayne Maynard, 1993/94–2000/01
 Michael Maynard, 2000
 Avelyn Medford, 1938/39
 Errol Millington, 1946/47–1950/51
 Marquino Mindley, 2018/19
 Joseph Moore, 1904/05
 Carlo Morris, 2004–2012/13
 Ezra Moseley, 1981/82–1991/92
 Hallam Moseley, 1969–1971/72
 Shayne Moseley, 2017/18–2019/20
 Carl Mullins, 1950/51–1953/54
 David Murray, 1970/71–1981/82

N

 Graydon Nesfield, 1964/65
 Joseph Newton, 1975/76–1976/77
 Anton Norris, 1962/63
 Ashley Nurse, 2010–2019/20
 Martin Nurse, 2001/02–2011/12
 Ryan Nurse, 2003/04–2007/08
 Rohan Nurse, 2008/09
 Seymour Nurse, 1958–1972/73

O

 Rachid O'Neale, 2011/12–2016/17
 Kjorn Ottley, 2019/20
 Barton Outram, 1903/04–1904/05
 Walter Outram, 1871/72

P

 Charles Packer, 1896/97–1897/98
 Edward Packer, 1883/84–1887/88
 James Packer, 1865/66
 Albert Padmore, 1972/73–1981/82
 Jason Parris, 2004–2008/09
 James Parris, 1925/26–1946/47
 Richard Parris, 1864/65–1865/66
 Colin Payne, 1971/72–1972/73
 Thelston Payne, 1978/79–1989/90
 Thomas Peirce, 1941/42–1948/49
 Joseph Phillips, 1919/20
 Neal Phillips, 1978/79–1984/85
 Omar Phillips, 2011/12–2017/18
 Wycliffe Phillips, 1966/67
 George Pile, 1883/84–1891/92
 John Pilgrim, 1887/88–1891/92
 Owen Pilgrim, 1919/20–1925/26
 Roshon Primus, 2019/20
 Ahmed Proverbs, 1990/91–2007/08
 Elbert Proverbs, 1982/83–1984/85
 Gordon Proverbs, 1948/49–1954/55
 Stanton Proverbs, 1989/90–1996/97
 Livingstone Puckerin, 1988/89–1995/96

R

 Mario Rampersaud, 2011/12–2017/18
 Shane Ramsay, 2008/09
 Courtenay Reece, 1926/27–1929/30
 Clinton Reed, 1899/1900
 Winston Reid, 1985/86–1999/2000
 Elvis Reifer, 1984/85–1985/86
 Floyd Reifer, 1991/92–2006/07
 George Reifer, 1979/80–1984/85
 Leslie Reifer, 1977/78–1988/89
 Dale Richards, 2000–2011/12
 Kemar Roach, 2005/06–2019/20
 Thomas Roberts, 1896/97–1897/98
 Oscar Robinson, 1943/44–1946/47
 George Rock, 1960/61–1968/69
 Cecil Rogers, 1935/36–1936/37
 Herbert Rogers, 1926/27–1928/29
 Terry Rollock, 1996/97–1997/98
 Stephen Rudder, 1895/96–1901/02

S

 Clinton St Hill, 1986/87
 Javon Searles, 2005/06–2019/20
 Glenroy Sealy, 1964/65
 Derek Sealy, 1928/29–1942/43
 Mark Sealy, 1987/88–1988/89
 Courtenay Selman, 1970/71–1973/74
 John Shepherd, 1964/65–1970/71
 William Shepherd, 1901/02–1905/06
 Henderson Simmons, 1970/71
 Henry Simmons, 1899/1900–1907/08
 Ernest Skeete, 1883/84–1887/88
 Harold Skeete, 1924/25–1928/29
 John Skeete, 1865/66
 Ricardo Skeete, 1975/76–1984/85
 Sam Skeete, 1989/90–1993/94
 Torrance Skeete, 1871/72–1887/88
 Eric Skelton, 1901/02
 Clarence Skinner, 1935/36
 Henry Skinner, 1941/42–1944/45
 Milton Small, 1983/84–1991/92
 Augustus Smith, 1864/65–1871/72
 AWL Smith, 1896/97
 Cammie Smith, 1951/52–1962/63
 Dwayne Smith, 2001/02–2015/16
 Eustace Smith, 1897/98
 Frederick Smith, 1864/65–1871/72
 Jamal Smith, 2011/12
 Richard Smith, 1893/94
 Garfield Sobers, 1952/53–1982/83
 Arthur Somers-Cocks, 1894/95–1904/05
 Francis Speed, 1871/72
 Thomas Speed, 1864/65
 Charles Spooner, 1933/34–1934/35
 Hendy Springer, 1987/88–1997/98
 Khalid Springer, 2007/08–2009/10
 Shamar Springer, 2017/18–2019/20
 Franklyn Stephenson, 1981/82–1989/90
 Kevin Stoute, 2006/07–2019/20
 Richard Straker, 1976/77–1978/79

T

 Percy Tarilton, 1905/06–1929/30
 Alfred Taylor, 1966/67
 Charlie Taylor, 1941/42–1951/52
 Antonio Thomas, 2001/02–2005/06
 Frank Thomas, 1944/45
 Randy Thomas, 2002/03
 Patterson Thompson, 1994/95–1998/99
 Peter Thompson, 1992/93–1993/94
 Herbert Thorne, 1891/92
 Emmerson Trotman, 1975/76–1981/82
 Henry Trotman, 1865/66
 John Trotman, 1864/65

W

 Gladstone Waithe, 1928/29–1940/41
 Clyde Walcott, 1941/42–1955/56
 Keith Walcott, 1940/41–1951/52
 Leslie Walcott, 1925/26–1935/36
 Michael Walcott, 1974/75
 Tevyn Walcott, 2017/18–2019/20
 Victor Walcott, 1986/87–1993/94
 Philo Wallace, 1989–2002/03
 Horace Walrond, 1992/93–1999/2000
 Hayden Walsh Jr., 2015/16–2018/19
 Edward Ward, 1928/29
 Kenneth Warren, 1954/55
 Jomel Warrican, 2011/12–2019/20
 Charles Webb, 1865/66
 Everton Weekes, 1944/45–1963/64
 Tony White, 1958–1965/66
 William White, 1903/04–1905/06
 George Whitehall, 1864/65–1871/72
 Ryan Wiggins, 2006/07–2016/17
 Kurt Wilkinson, 2000–2005/06
 Cecil Williams, 1947/48–1956/57
 Foffie Williams, 1934/35–1951/52
 Joseph Williams, 1995/96–1997/98
 Kenroy Williams, 2004/05–2017/18
 Lionel Williams, 1956/57–1964/65
 Gerald Wood, 1948/49–1958/59
 Lear Wood, 1924/25
 Rupert Wood, 1933/34–1938/39
 Clarence Worme, 1899/1900
 Stanley Worme, 1905/06–1912/13
 Frank Worrell, 1941/42–1946/47
 Michael Worrell, 1982/83–1986/87

Y

 Merlon Yarde, 1969/70
 Barrington Yearwood, 2008/09
 Dwayne Yearwood, 2008/09
 Lawrence Yearwood, 1910/11
 Rondelle Yearwood, 2000

Notes

References

Cricket in Barbados
Barbados